The Tashkent Metro is the rapid transit system serving the city of Tashkent, the capital of Uzbekistan. It was the seventh metro to be built in the former USSR, opening in 1977, and was the first subway system in Central Asia. Each station is designed around a particular theme, often reflected in the station name.

In 2022, the metro carried 220 million passengers, which corresponds to a daily average of approximately 620,000 riders.

History
Planning for the Tashkent Metro started in 1968, two years after a major earthquake struck the city in 1966. Construction on the first line began in 1972 and it opened on 6 November 1977 with nine stations.  This line was extended in 1980, and the second line was added in 1984.  The most recent line is the Circle (Halqa) Line, the first section of which opened in 2020.

A northern extension of the Yunusobod Line for 2 stations Turkiston and Yunusobod was completed and opened on 29 August 2020. The fourth Circle line is currently under construction, first 7 stations for the line have already been built in 2020.

Operations
The Tashkent Metro operates 3 regular lines and a 1 circle line (under further extension), which currently runs 51.4 km of route and serve 43 stations. The metro network employs more than 4,200 staff. In 2021, revenues from fares amount to 10.5 billion soum a month.

The strong construction of these three lines can resist earthquakes of a magnitude of 9.0 on the Richter scale. It sports a  gauge and a third rail power supply (825 V DC).

Lines

Currently, Tashkent Metro is operating 4 lines

Chilonzor Line (red)

Construction on this line started in 1968, opened in 1977 between Olmazor (previously named as Sabir Rakhimov) and Amir Temur Khiyoboni (previously named as Oktyabr Inqilobi) including Novza (previously named as Khamza) depot and one metro bridge over Oqtepa channel between Novza and Milliy Bog' (previously named as Komsomolskaya) stations. It was extended to Buyuk Ipak Yoli (previously names as Maksim Gorkiy) in 1980 (including another metro bridge over Salar river between Hamid Olimjon and Pushkin stations).

A 7 km extension of the Chilonzor Line south from Olmazor station to Quipchoq (5-Bekat) station in the Sergeli district of Tashkent was built in 3 years and inaugurated by President Shavkat Mirziyoyev on 26 December 2020.

The future planned 3 stations eastward extension from Buyuk Ipak Yoli to TTZ (Toshkent Traktor Zavodi) is under consideration.

Oʻzbekiston Line (blue)

The route of this line crosses the city diagonally from northwest to southeast via the Toshkent Railway station. It opened in 1984 and expanded between 1984 and 1991.

Yunusobod Line (green)

Work is under way on this line to connect the northern districts to the airport in the south. The first  section with 8 underground stations opened for regular service on 24 October 2001 between Mingurik and Shahriston (previously named as Habib Abdullayev).

Circle Line (brown)

Construction of new line started in October 2017. The project will be completed in 5 stages and developed and implemented jointly with specialists from Russia, Turkey and Germany.

In February 2020 it was reported that construction of the first section of the Circle Line from Do'stlik to Qo'yliq stations was finished and that new rolling stock for the Circle Line was undergoing trials. On 30 August 2020, Circle line's first section was opened.

Stations

Today, the Tashkent Metro has 43 stations that differ from each other. The architecture and décor of each station depicts its name. The peculiarity of the Tashkent metro is its rather shallow station positioning. Some stations have escalators, 7 stations belong to the tower type, 4 stations to the arch type and one station (Mustaqillik Maydoni) to the tower-individual type. Prominent architects and artists of Uzbekistan took part in designing the stations. Interior décor features solid and stable materials: metal (in the form of engravings), glass, plastic, granite, marble, smalt, art ceramics, and carved alabaster. Each station is original work of art and centers on a particular theme. After the break up of the Soviet Union in 1991 many stations were renamed to remove references to Communism.

Ticketing

In 2020, an automated payment system based on NFC technology was introduced at all metro stations. Stationary validators were installed as well. A single transport card (ATTO), which was initially used in test mode at the Bodomzor and Mustaqillik Maydoni metro stations, fully replaced the use of tokens in the Tashkent metro from 1 November 2020.

The card can be replenished at the metro ticketing offices, information kiosks, ticket sale points, as well as through electronic payment systems (such as Oson, Apelsin, MyUzCard, Click, Payme, PAYNET) and the ATTO mobile application. There are 3 types of preferential transport cards, which can be individually applied for school pupils, university students and elderly people at public services offices

One ride costs 1,400 soum (US$0.13), regardless of distance traveled or number of transfers. Fare enforcement takes place at the points of entry to the stations. Once a passenger has entered the Metro system, there are no further ticket checks – one can ride to any number of stations and make transfers within the system freely. Transfers to other public transport systems, such as bus, are not covered by the ticket.

However, Metro authorities reported that it is planned to introduce a differentiated tariff system, based on travel distance in the second half of 2021.

Rolling stock

Ezh3/Em-508T: 1977–1985. 
81-717/714: 1980–present. 
81-718/719: 2001–present. 
81-717M: 2015–present. 
81-765.5/766.5/767.5: 2020–present

Like in all Soviet metro systems, the basic type of rolling stock is known as the 81-717/81-714. , there are 168 81-717/714 train cars operational on the metro, and they are operated in the form 4-car trainsets serving the system's  station platforms. Services started with carriages of type Ezh3 and Em-508T. By the mid 1980s, all these subway cars were given to Baku and Tbilisi metro. In exchange, the metro has received trains of series 81-717/81-714, which are still in service today.

In 2001, Tashkent metro has received newer trains of 81-718/719. There were plans to purchase trains of series 81-717.6/714.6 for the metro but that didn't happen. There was a decision to modernize the existing 81-717 trains in the Tashkent Carriage Repair Factory. The first modernized train appeared in 2015.

In 2019 new trains of type 81-765/766/767 were ordered for the opening of the Circle line, and with its opening they were given from Uzbekistan line to the Circle line. It is planned to purchase 45 trains of the newest type for the Circle line. If not, then Tashkent metro will receive trains of type 81-775/776/777 that are currently produced in Metrovagonmash.

In April 2021, Tashkent Metro signed a contract to purchase 10 new Russian-made trains from Metrovagonmash. The service life of metro cars and frames is 30 years. The windshield of the driver’s cab will be equipped with an adjustable manual sunscreen, taking into account the peculiarities of the Tashkent metro – some of the Tashkent metro lines run on the ground.

Future extension plans
Besides building of Circle line around Tashkent metropolitan, Tashkent Metro is working on extension of the current metro lines to more 10 stations. By 2030, Tashkent Metro is planning to build 2 metro stations from the Beruniy station to Karakamysh district, 3 underground metro stations from the station Buyuk Ipak Yoli to TTZ (Toshkent traktor zavodi) neighborhood and 5 stations from the station Ming Orik to the Tashkent Janubiy (South) railway station.

In March 2021, Metro officials reported about second stage extension of the Circle line. This stage includes a section from the Kuylyuk market, through the Tashkent Ring Road to the capital's Yangihayot district, connecting Khanabad Street in the Zangiata district (Tashkent region) with Kipchak Street in the Sergeli district of Tashkent, including the "5-Bekat" station of the new Sergeli metro line.

The Kuylyuk – Kipchak – Yangihayot section is expected to serve about 46 thousand passengers daily. Also, about 700 new jobs will be created.

In March 2021, the Tashkent Metro carried up to 330,000 passengers a day on weekdays and 150,000 passengers on weekends. The goal is to increase the number of passengers to 1 million per day.

Network map

See also

 Trams in Tashkent
 List of rapid transit systems

References

External links
 Tashkent Metro track map
 article at msn.com
  article, with images at advantour.com
 BBC Travel website – report on the Tashkent Metro
New York Times Article with subway photos

 
1977 establishments in the Soviet Union
Rail transport articles in need of updating
825 V DC railway electrification